Yang Chengang (born February 18, 1979) is a Chinese singer popular for being the original performer of the hit song "Mice Love Rice".

Discography

Albums 
 Lao Shu Ai Da Mi, December 2004
 Yang Chen Gang Mei Er Ai Wo, May 2005
 Internet Pop Musician, December 2005
 Wo Shi Ni Lao Gong, January 2006
 Lao Gong PK Lao Po, August 2006

References 
 Yang Chen Gang in YesAsia

Chinese Mandopop singers
Living people
Singers from Hubei
Musicians from Wuhan
1979 births
21st-century Chinese male singers